Climate effects of climate change on the availability, usability, and accessibility of food supplies in Africa are referred to as climate change and food security in Africa. Africa's agricultural industry has already begun to feel the effects of climate change, which have resulted in lower crop yields, animal losses, and higher food prices. Given that the majority of the people in Africa depend on agriculture for a living, the effect of climate change on food security in the region is a serious problem. Africa's agriculture and climate change are strongly related, Millions of people in Africa depend on the agricultural industry for their economic well-being and means of subsistence. Yet a variety of climate change-related factors such as altered rainfall patterns, rising temperatures, droughts, and floods are having a negative impact on the agricultural industry. Many African populations access to food is being impacted by these effects, which include decreasing crop yields, animal losses, and rising food prices.

Effects of Climate Change on Africa's Food Security 
Climate change has significantly impacted food security in Africa. The reduction in crop yields brought on by altered rainfall patterns and increased temperatures is one of the most important effects. Climate change has also boosted pests and illnesses, endangering food output even more. Many Africans now find it difficult to get food due to rising food prices brought on by crop loss. The loss of livestock due to disease and drought is another effect of climate change on food security in Africa. For many people in Africa, livestock is a vital source of food, income, and labor. "The loss of animals, which has also resulted in livelihood losses, has further exacerbated the food security situation. Climate change poses a serious challenge to food security in Africa, where agricultural yields have been gradually dropping, and where population growth and increased demand for food, water, and forage increase the possibility of hunger and under-nutrition.

The main sources of Africa's 3.6% share of the world's CO2 emissions are gas flaring in the Niger and coal-fired power plants in South Africa. But, the continent's forests are rapidly disappearing, which has terrible consequences for both Africa and the climate at large. Despite having very low CO2 emissions in comparison to other places, Africa is more vulnerable than other continents to the damaging effects of extreme weather because of its unique vulnerabilities. In West Africa's arid and semi-arid regions, dry terrain or desert makes up three-quarters of the continent's surface. The Sahel is a region in East Africa Southern Africa, and Sudan. Economic activity is dependent on climate-sensitive industries, such as rain-fed agriculture, fisheries, mining, oil & gas, forestry, tourism, etc. Agriculture contributes around 70% of employment, 30% of GDP, and 50% of exports in a rain-fed economy. The agriculture industry serves as a safety net for rural poor people. People are increasingly susceptible since drought and flooding are more frequent and intense in many areas, including the nations surrounding the Rift Valley, the plains of Mozambique, Senegal, and The Gambia.

African Food Security and Climate Change Adaptation Strategies 
Many adaptation measures are being put into practice to lessen the impact of climate change on food security in Africa. The creation and adoption of climate-resilient agricultural techniques are one of the most crucial tactics. Using crops that can withstand drought, improving soil and water conservation, and integrated pest management are some of these methods. The diversification of sources of income is an additional adaptive technique. Many communities in Africa rely solely on one type of food or livestock for survival, leaving them particularly susceptible to the effects of climate change. A buffer against climate shocks can be created through diversifying income sources, such as through off-farm revenue-generating activities. Moreover, enhancing food distribution and storage methods might contribute to decreased food waste and increased food availability. Farmers may invest in climate-resilient practices and technologies by having better access to credit and financial services.

The following adaptation strategies are being developed by individuals, groups, and institutions to mitigate climate change risks:

 Climate-smart agriculture production
 Diversification of sources of income and alternative livelihoods
 Decentralization of local resource control
 Alternative Eco-friendly energy sources
 Infrastructure development 
 Information on the climate;
 Early warning systems
 Insurance program

References

External links 
 https://reliefweb.int/organization/kenya-red-cross
 https://www.uncclearn.org/wp-content/uploads/library/fao34.pdf

Climate change adaptation
Environmental education